Sergei Viktorovich Parshivlyuk (born 18 March 1989) is a Russian footballer who plays as a right-back for FC Dynamo Moscow.

Career

Club
Parshivlyuk attended "Spartak Moscow" football school. In his youth, he began as a forward, then as a right midfielder, and he has finally become a right back.
He made his first appearance for the senior team on 27 July 2007 when he came off the substitutes' bench to replace Martin Jiránek in a league game against Zenit St. Petersburg. His debut at the European level came on 4 October 2007 in a UEFA Cup match between BK Häcken and Spartak. In the 2011–12 season, Parshivlyuk was named as club captain at Spartak.

On 31 August 2016, Parshivlyuk signed a three-year contract with Anzhi Makhachkala.

On 9 June 2017, he moved to FC Rostov, signing a 2-year contract.

On 24 June 2019, he signed a 2-year contract with an 1-year extension option with FC Dynamo Moscow. He extended his contract with Dynamo for the 2021–22 season on 12 June 2021. On 20 June 2022, he extended his contract for 2022–23 season and announced he will also enroll in a coaching academy, with hope to eventually transition to Dynamo's coaching staff.

Career statistics

Club

International career
Parshivlyuk was included as part of the Russia U21 squad that competed in the 2011 European Under-21 Championship qualification.

He was called up but did not feature with the Russia national football team for the Euro 2012 qualifier in October 2010 against Macedonia and Ireland. He made his debut for the team on 3 September 2014 in a friendly against Azerbaijan.

References

External links
  Player page on the official FC Spartak Moscow website
 

1989 births
Footballers from Moscow
Living people
Russian people of Ukrainian descent
Russian footballers
Association football defenders
Russia international footballers
Russia under-21 international footballers
FC Spartak Moscow players
FC Spartak-2 Moscow players
FC Anzhi Makhachkala players
FC Rostov players
FC Dynamo Moscow players
Russian Premier League players
Russian First League players